Broomfield House is a building of historical interest located in Broomfield Park, Palmers Green, north London. Built during the 16th century, it was damaged by fires in 1984, 1993, 1994 and 2019.

History
Broomfield House was sold to London merchant Joseph Jackson in 1624 after several previous occupants. During the 150 years that the Jackson family were in possession of the house, the house was internally remodelled to a considerable extent. The grand staircase was built and murals were painted by Gerard Lanscroon, and the surrounding Broomfield Park was created. During the late 18th century to early 19th century the once U-shaped building was altered into a rectangular shape, enclosing the once east-facing courtyard.

Between 1907 and 1910 the building housed Southgate County School, with Southgate's first maternity centre opening there in 1917. The building was classified as Grade II* in 1950 because of its history and architectural uniqueness.

Fires

In 1984 a fire broke out in the building which damaged the roof and the top floor. The cause was deemed to be electrical. A temporary roof was erected to ensure further damage was kept to a minimum, though a permanent roof was not rebuilt as the house was no longer in use. Further fires in 1993-1994 made the building in its current state unusable and unsafe. Though the council wanted to demolish the building, heritage groups persuaded the council to obtain a report looking into the possibility of restoration. The report concluded that restoration should be undertaken, and the building was made safe.

On Tuesday 9 April 2019 early morning park visitors called the Fire Brigade to a large fire at the house; further extensive damage was sustained. The building remains enclosed by scaffolding until details of the full restoration and its future use by the community can be agreed upon.

Restoration
In 2003 Broomfield House was featured on the BBC television series Restoration as a nominee for the south-east segment of the show, alongside Wilton's Music Hall in London and Darnley Mausoleum in Kent; Broomfield House lost out to Wilton's Music Hall.

On 25 November 2009 the transformation of Broomfield House took another step forward, as the Mayor of London's office confirmed that £500,000 was to be made available for preparatory and public consultation work. The plan was to make the house into sheltered housing accommodation. Concerns were raised by some local people about the proposals which the council were to address as part of its public consultation. An unknown proportion of the £500,000 was used to create extensive evaluations of environmental issues, planning ideas and the way forward. However, further funding was later withdrawn.

References

External links
 Broomfield House Community Restoration website

Grade II* listed houses in London
Houses in the London Borough of Enfield
Country houses in London
Palmers Green
Buildings and structures completed in the 16th century
16th-century architecture in England
History of Middlesex
Middlesex